Achraf Dari (born 6 May 1999) is a Moroccan professional footballer who plays as a defender for  club Brest and the Morocco national team. He started his professional career playing for Wydad AC.

Dari represented Morocco at various youth levels, before making his international debut in 2021. He was chosen in Morocco's squads for the FIFA Arab Cup in 2021.

Club career

Wydad 
Dari began his professional football career with Wydad AC. On 31 May 2022, Dari won his first international trophy with Wydad after defeating Al Ahly 2–0 in 2022 CAF Champions League Final. On 30 June 2022, Dari was nominated for the CAF inter club player of the year awards.

Brest 
On 30 July 2022, Dari signed for Ligue 1 club Brest on a four-year contract. The transfer fee paid to Wydad AC was reported to be in the region of €2.7 million. On 7 August 2022, Dari made his debut against RC Lens. On 21 August, Dari scored his first professional goal for the club in a 3–1 victory against Angers SCO.

International career 
Dari made his debut for the Morocco A' national football team in a 1–0 win over Saudi Arabia at the 2021 FIFA Arab Cup. On 12 June 2022, Vahid Halilhodžić summoned Dari to the Moroccan national football team. He made his debut in a 2–0 victory against Liberia in the 2023 Africa Cup of Nations qualification that took place in the Stade Mohammed V.

In September 2022, Dari was called up to join the Morocco national team to take part in Friendlies matches against Chile and Paraguay.

On 10 November 2022, he was named in Morocco's 23-man squad for the 2022 FIFA World Cup in Qatar. On 17 December, he scored his first international goal in the World Cup third-place playoff against Croatia, which ended in a 2–1 defeat.

Career statistics

Club

International

Scores and results list goal tally first, score column indicates score after each Dari goal.

Honours
Wydad AC 
Botola: 2018–19, 2020–21, 2021–22
CAF Champions League : 2021–22; runner-up: 2018–19

Morocco U20
Jeux de la Francophonie: 2017

Individual
CAF Champions League Best Defender: 2021–22

References

1999 births
Living people
Moroccan footballers
Footballers from Casablanca
Association football defenders
Morocco international footballers
Morocco A' international footballers
Morocco youth international footballers
Morocco under-20 international footballers
2020 African Nations Championship players
Botola players
Ligue 1 players
Wydad AC players
Stade Brestois 29 players
2022 FIFA World Cup players
Moroccan expatriate footballers
Moroccan expatriate sportspeople in France
Expatriate footballers in France